Back to Ararat is a 1988 Swedish documentary film about the Armenian genocide. The film won the Guldbagge Award for Best Film at the 24th Guldbagge Awards. The film featured interviews with poet Gevorg Emin and his son Artashes Emin.

References

External links
 
 

1988 films
1988 documentary films
Swedish documentary films
1980s French-language films
Armenian genocide films
Armenian-language films
Best Film Guldbagge Award winners
Documentary films about the Armenian genocide
1980s English-language films
1980s Swedish films